Jean Montalat (12 July 1912, Tulle - 22 September 1971) was a French politician. During the Second World War, he was drafted into and subsequently joined the Alliance network of the French Resistance, escaping to Algeria in 1943 to join the Free French forces.  He represented the French Section of the Workers' International (SFIO) in the National Assembly from 1951 to 1971 and was the mayor of Tulle from 1959 to 1971.

References

1912 births
1971 deaths
People from Tulle
Politicians from Nouvelle-Aquitaine
French Section of the Workers' International politicians
Deputies of the 2nd National Assembly of the French Fourth Republic
Deputies of the 3rd National Assembly of the French Fourth Republic
Deputies of the 1st National Assembly of the French Fifth Republic
Deputies of the 2nd National Assembly of the French Fifth Republic
Deputies of the 3rd National Assembly of the French Fifth Republic
Deputies of the 4th National Assembly of the French Fifth Republic
Mayors of places in Nouvelle-Aquitaine
French military personnel of World War II
French Resistance members
Free French military personnel of World War II
Recipients of the Croix de Guerre 1939–1945 (France)
Recipients of the Resistance Medal